Georgios Stathis (born 1906, date of death unknown) was a Greek sports shooter. He competed at the 1936, 1948 and 1952 Summer Olympics.

References

1906 births
Year of death missing
Greek male sport shooters
Olympic shooters of Greece
Shooters at the 1936 Summer Olympics
Shooters at the 1948 Summer Olympics
Shooters at the 1952 Summer Olympics
Place of birth missing
20th-century Greek people